Arop-Lokep (also spelled Arop-Lukep) is an Oceanic language spoken by 3,015 people on four islands in the Siassi chain in the Vitiaz Strait in Papua New Guinea.

Phonology

Vowels

 is rare.

Consonants

 is rare.

External links
A sample of Arop-Lokep can be listened to here: http://globalrecordings.net/en/program/C16210

References

Korap languages
Languages of Papua New Guinea